Pontedeume is a municipality in the province of A Coruña in the autonomous community of Galicia in northwestern Spain.

The town was founded ex novo by the town charter of Alfonso X the Wise in 1270.
The town is located on the English Way path of the Camino de Santiago.

Industry 

Farming and services are the main economic activities, though from the late 1950s, and particularly from the mid 1970s, Pontedeume has developed into a coastal resort.

Geography

Parishes 

Pontedeume is divided into 8 parishes: Andrade (San Martiño), Boebre (Santiago), Breamo (San Miguel), Centroña (Santa María), Nogueirosa (San Cosme), Ombre (Santa María), Pontedeume (Santiago) and Vilar (San Pedro).

Demography 
In 1868 and from 1877 to 1890 the territory of Vilarmaior was a part of the municipality of Pontedeume. This explains the pronounced fall in the population between 1877 and 1900.

Notable people
 Fátima Rodríguez (b. 1961), Spanish writer, translator

References

Municipalities in the Province of A Coruña
Castles in Galicia (Spain)